Alfred Vincent Smith (23 January 1913 – 17 February 1995) was an Australian rules footballer who played with Hawthorn in the Victorian Football League (VFL).

Hawthorn granted Smith a clearance to the Brocklesby Football Club, NSW where they finish 3rd in 1937 and 4th in 1938 in the Albury & District Football League with Smith as their captain / coach.

Smith was runner up Albury & DFL best and fairest award in 1937 and finished 3rd in the 1938 medal.

Smith played with Sandringham Football Club in 1939 and 1940, prior to enlisting with the AIF in World War Two.

Notes

External links 

Smith's World War Two Service Record
1938 - Brocklesby FC Presentation Night photo

1913 births
1995 deaths
Australian rules footballers from Melbourne
Hawthorn Football Club players
Camberwell Football Club players
People from Hawthorn, Victoria
Military personnel from Melbourne
Australian military personnel of World War II